Thryptomene velutina is a shrub species in the family Myrtaceae that is endemic to Western Australia.

The shrub is found in the Mid West region of Western Australia between Geraldton and the Chapman Valley.

Etymology
The specific epithet, velutina, is from the Latin adjective, velutinus, -a, -um,  ("velvety"), and refers to the flower's velvety hypanthium, which  distinguishes it from other Thryptomene species.

References

velutina
Endemic flora of Western Australia
Rosids of Western Australia
Vulnerable flora of Australia
Plants described in 2014
Taxa named by Barbara Lynette Rye
Taxa named by Malcolm Eric Trudgen